Hand of Fate is a 2013 Gambian film which focuses on human rights issues. It provides insights into the situation of teenage girls who are given out to marriage by their parent without their consent or knowledge and how their education and future carriers are being affected along the way. The Children and Community Initiative for Development in partnership with the Mandingmorry Foundation for Performing Arts (MANFOPA) made this film possible.

The film was based on a 2009 book written by the Gambian playwright and theater director Janet Badjan Young. Ibrahim Ceesay produced and directed the film.

Plot
The film is about a young girl who had her future taken away from her when she was forced to marry a man she did not love.

Cast 
 Mariama Colley
 John Charles Njie  
 Cornelius Gomez
 Oley Saidykhan
 Suzy Joh
 Babette Mendy Jalllow

Awards 
Hand of Faith won the best indigenous film in Nolloywood and African Film Critics Awards (African Oscars) held in Washington D.C on the 14th of September 2013.

References 

2013 films
Gambian drama films
Films based on novels
Films about human rights